Dibrompropamidine is an antiseptic and disinfectant. As dibrompropamidine isethionate, it is used in eyedrops and ointment for the treatment of minor eye and eyelid infections in adults and children. In the UK, such preparations are sold under the brand names Brolene (Aventis Pharma), Golden Eye (Typharm Ltd), and Brulidine (Manx Healthcare).

Characteristics
Dibrompropamidine is a white or almost white crystalline powder. It is odourless or almost odourless. Dibrompropamidine is freely soluble in water, soluble in glycerol, sparingly soluble in ethanol (96%), and practically insoluble in chloroform, in ether, in liquid paraffin and in fixed oils. 

Amidines
Antiseptics
Bromoarenes
Phenol ethers

References